Qais Abd al-Karim, also known as Abu Layla or Qays Samarra’i, is a leading Palestinian activist of Iraqi origin.

He is a leader of the Democratic Front for the Liberation of Palestine, and a member of the Palestinian Legislative Council.

In 2006 he was one of two deputies elected from The Alternative (al-Badil) list, an alliance between the DFLP, the Palestinian People's Party and the Palestine Democratic Union (FIDA).

References

Year of birth missing (living people)
Living people
Democratic Front for the Liberation of Palestine politicians
Members of the 2006 Palestinian Legislative Council